Edwin Arnold Stone (October 9, 1892 – July 29, 1948) was a pitcher in Major League Baseball. He played for the Pittsburgh Pirates.

References

External links

1892 births
1948 deaths
Major League Baseball pitchers
Pittsburgh Pirates players
Baseball players from New York (state)